Aboriginal reserves in New South Wales, together with Stations, and Aboriginal Missions in New South Wales were areas of land where many Aboriginal people were forced to live in accordance with laws and policies. The British government, which controlled the Australian colonies, and later the state governments had various policies of segregation and assimilation. The Aboriginal reserves were established by government authorities as portions of land set aside for the sole use of Aboriginal people, a practice that continued after Federation in 1901. Of the 85 Aboriginal reserves created from 1885 to 1895, 47 were initiated by Aboriginal families. The Register of Aboriginal Reserves 1875-1904 held by NSW State Archives includes a map of the locality and a description of the area and whether it is good for hunting and fishing.

The reserves were operated under the direction of various government authorities including the Aborigines Protection Board (1883–1940), the Aborigines Welfare Board (1940–1969) and the Aborigines Welfare Directorate (1969–1975).

Aboriginal reserves, like the missions and other institutions, had the effect of isolating, confining and controlling Aboriginal people. People who were relocated to these reserves lost the human rights of freedom of movement and work, control over their personal property and the custody of their children. In New South Wales, some reserves were created in response to complaints by white residents who objected to Aboriginal people living in towns or in fringe camps on the edges of towns. Aboriginal Reserves were gazetted in the Government Gazette of the State of New South Wales. There were two types of reserves, managed reserves which are frequently called stations were normally staffed by a manager or matron and residents were provided with rations and housing. Unmanaged reserves provided only rations and were under the control of the local police.

Following World War I, a number of reserves were revoked, which may be linked to the allocation of land to returned servicemen.

In 1945, there were more than 100 reserves under the control of the Aborigines Welfare Board.  Between 1954 and 1964 more than 25 reserves were revoked, which may be due to policies of assimilation and the relocation of people to town reserves.  In 1953 there were 19 reserves under the control of the board, and at least one (Moree) was being actively consolidated and housing expanded. Reserves were sometimes added to, enlarging the area or revoked in portions over time.

The system of reserves and stations was ended by the Aborigines Act 1969. The Aboriginal Lands Trust was established by the Aborigines (Amendment) Act 1973. The Trust assumed the corporate ownership of all Aboriginal reserves throughout New South Wales on behalf of, and for the benefit of Aboriginal people. Freehold title to the remaining reserves was transferred to the Trust, to maintain, develop or dispose of these reserves in the manner which would best serve the needs of the Aboriginal community. The Trust was also responsible for houses located on the reserves. The Aboriginal Lands Trust was abolished by the Aboriginal Land Rights Act 1983. The property was transferred to the Minister for Aboriginal Affairs and from there to Aboriginal Land Councils.

In 1997 a system of Indigenous Protected Areas (IPAs) was introduced in Australia. The remaining Aboriginal Reserves in New South Wales are not automatically part of this system.

Early history
In the 1870s and 1880s, land reserves were gazetted for specific individuals from Aboriginal clans including: 
 Amos Lewis and others (15 June 1875)
 W. Campbell (13 July 1875)
 Richard Bolway (aka Bolloway or Bollaway) (19 October 1877)
 Merriman (19 October 1877)
 Yarboro (19 October 1877)
 Neddy (20 May 1878)
 Henry Roberts (19 August 1878) No. 43 county of Wellington, parish of Tunnabidgee. Revoked 8 June 1882.
 Mary Ann Willoughby (14 February 1879), 140 acres of No. 86, county of St.Vincent, parish of Mongarlowe.
 James Murray (7 April 1879) No. 1,056 county of Ashburnham, parish of Canomodine
 William Benson (22 November 1880)
 Tommy Again (14 June 1880) No. 76 county of Wellington, parish of Tunnabidgee (24 July 1882) No. 76a county of Wellington, parish of Tunnabidgee
John Ambrose (11 August 1874) No. 1,209 county of Goulburn, parish of Vautier. Revoked 14 February 1881.
 Henry Wedge (11 July 1881) and (28 February 1883) 
 Billy Billy (4 August 1884)
 Margaret Bryant (20 May 1885), just under 9 acres of No. 133, county of St.Vincent, parish of Mongarlowe Revoked 29 April 1893.
 John Bell (11 June 1887) and (09 February 1889)

A

B

C

D

E

F

G

H

I

J

K

L

M

N

O

P

Q

R

S

T

U

W

Y

See also
 Aboriginal reserve
 Indigenous Protected Area
 List of Aboriginal missions in New South Wales

References

Further reading
 
 
 

History of Indigenous Australians
History of New South Wales
Reserves in New South Wales